Diyojen (“Diogenes“) was the first Ottoman satirical magazine of the Ottoman Empire. The first issue was published in Istanbul on 24 November 1870  by the satirist Teodor Kasap (1835-1905). The caricatures published in Diyojen appeared without signs of the artists. It came out weekly in three year's issues and was banned for good in 1873 after 183 numbers. Apart from satirical pieces, the magazine became known for its caricatures and the translation of French literature. Kasap, who also worked as journalist and playwright, published other satirical magazines after the ban. In Hayal (“Fantasy” or “Illusion“), which existed from 1873 until 1877, he among other things used caricatures and satirical articles to criticize the arbitrary press law.

References

Further reading
 Turgut Çeviker. (1986). Gelişim Sürecinde Türk Karikatür 1. Tanzimat Dönemi ve İstibdat Dönemi (1867-1878 / 1878-1908), Istanbul. 

1870 establishments in the Ottoman Empire
1873 disestablishments in the Ottoman Empire
Defunct magazines published in Turkey
Magazines established in 1870
Magazines disestablished in 1873
Magazines published in Istanbul
Satirical magazines published in Turkey
Weekly magazines published in Turkey